Sports USA Media is the largest independent sports broadcasting radio network in the United States, specializing in live broadcasts of American football, specifically of the NCAA football Division I-A and National Football League (NFL). In 2018, more than 450 radio stations across the United States carried NFL and NCAA football games from Sports USA.

Programs

The NFL on Sports USA
Sports USA began broadcasting NFL games in 2002. It broadcasts two games every Sunday during the NFL regular season for a total of 34 games.

College Football on Sports USA
Sports USA broadcasts at least one major college football game every Saturday during the college football season. In addition, Sports USA periodically broadcasts a Thursday night match up, along with select bowl games.

The NHL on Sports USA 

In February 2021, Sports USA reached a deal with NBC Sports, which was phasing out of both radio and hockey, to take over its rights to national radio broadcasts of the National Hockey League. That season, it aired two outdoor games, selected early round playoff games, and all games from the Stanley Cup Semifinals and Finals. Later in 2021, Sports USA renewed its rights until the 2024-25 season. Unlike other league's major championship coverage, this coverage is not exclusive and stations that are affiliated with the participating Stanley Cup Final team's radio networks will be allowed to carry and stream coverage.

Other sports
Sports USA Media also carries the Little League World Series, NFL Draft and horse racing from the Horse Racing Radio Network. HRRN also produces the Triple Crown of Thoroughbred Racing (Kentucky Derby, Preakness Stakes and Belmont Stakes); however distribution is handled by Westwood One.

Announcers
Sports USA has a large list of announcers for its football coverage. Play-by play announcers include the network's founder and former USC Trojans football broadcaster Larry Kahn, Anaheim Ducks broadcaster John Ahlers, FOX Sports announcer Adam Amin, former USC Trojans football and Los Angeles Rams head coach John Robinson, former Colorado head coach Gary Barnett, former ABC announcer and quarterback Dan Fouts (Fouts also splits time with the NFL on CBS), Ross Tucker, Golden State Warriors announcer Bob Fitzgerald, former USFL defensive back Troy West, and Eli Gold (voice of the Alabama Crimson Tide, perhaps better known nationally for his work on NASCAR). Analysts include former Chicago Bears safety Doug Plank, former Indianapolis Colts tight end and ESPN, studio and game analyst Charles Arbuckle, and Anaheim Ducks color commentator Brian Hayward. Veteran Los Angeles reporter and broadcaster for KFWB Ted Sobel acts as the network's studio host and reporter.

Podcasts
Sports USA also produces a variety of sports podcasts.

Conversations with Joe Morgan was a weekly podcast from the Cincinnati Reds late Hall of Famer and two-time World Series Champion Joe Morgan. Previous guests on Morgan's program show included the late former President George H. W. Bush, Bill Russell, Bob Costas, Charles Barkley and a host of others.

Snakes Takes with Jake Plummer is a weekly podcast hosted by former Pro Bowl quarterback who played 10 seasons in the NFL with the Arizona Cardinals and Denver Broncos. Jake Plummer is currently an NFL game analyst on Sports USA's Sunday Doubleheader package as well as a college football analyst on the Pac-12 Network.

The Fred Dryer Show is a weekly podcast hosted by the former All-Pro NFL Defensive End and star of the hit television series Hunter on NBC.

Ted Sobel's Excellent Sports Adventure is a weekly podcast hosted by Ted Sobel, who joined Sports USA in 2005 as a sideline reporter and studio host for NFL and college football games.  Ted Sobel is the recipient of three Golden Mike Awards for his work as a sports reporter/anchor at KFWB 980 in Los Angeles.

References

External links
Sports USA Radio

 
Sports radio networks in the United States
National Football League on the radio
College football on the radio